Enos Claire Kirkpatrick (December 9, 1884 – April 14, 1964) was a third baseman in Major League Baseball who played from 1912 through 1915 for the Brooklyn Dodgers and the Baltimore Terrapins. He went to college at Duquesne University.

External links

1884 births
1964 deaths
Major League Baseball third basemen
Brooklyn Dodgers players
Brooklyn Superbas players
Baltimore Terrapins players
Baseball players from Pittsburgh
Duquesne Dukes baseball players
Burials at Calvary Catholic Cemetery (Pittsburgh)
Richmond Colts players
Lynchburg Shoemakers players
Macon Peaches players
Atlanta Crackers players
Portsmouth Truckers players
Petersburg Goobers players
Dayton Veterans players
Newark Indians players
Wilkes-Barre Barons (baseball) players